Peripatus sedgwicki is a species of velvet worm in the Peripatidae family. Females of this species have 29 to 32 pairs of legs; males have 28 to 30. Females range from 25 mm to 60 mm in length, while males range from 23 mm to 30 mm. The type locality is in Venezuela.

References

Onychophorans of tropical America
Onychophoran species
Animals described in 1899